The Coldest Game (Polish: Ukryta gra) is a 2019 English-language Polish spy film. It is directed by Łukasz Kośmicki and stars Bill Pullman as Joshua Mansky, an American alcoholic former chess champion who becomes involved in a Cold War confrontation between nuclear superpowers.

This spy thriller is the last film produced by Piotr Woźniak-Starak, who died in an apparent boating accident shortly before the premiere.

Plot
The film starts with text setting the background of the height of the Cold War, with Soviet troops stationed in Cuba after the revolution, and President Kennedy being informed in 1962 that the USSR are likely to be preparing for war, during the Cuban Missile Crisis.
The first scene is one of a Grand Master chess match. One of the players (the American) walks out to the table where the other (the Russian) is already seated. The American looks dazed and has a blood stain on his hand.

We cut back to seven days earlier, when the American chess player, an unkempt middle aged man, is talking to a taxi driver who addresses him as the ‘professor’ and drops him off at his apartment. As the chess player walks in, a car pulls up outside the apartment. We cut to a scene in a bar where the chess player is in a card game with three others and switches off a TV news item about the upcoming chess match between Soviet champion Alexander Gavrylov and the American Konigsberg. The chess player wins the card game, takes the money and then receives his cut from the barman. This seems to be a source of income for the chess player.

An attractive girl in the bar (Agent Stone) approaches the chess player, whom she recognizes as Joshua Mansky, a brilliant mathematician and former champion chess player. She offers a proposal, only for Mansky to walk out of the bar before hearing it; he is followed out of the bar by another man (Agent White) who bundles him into the back of the car that was waiting outside his apartment. His agent kidnappers take him on board a plane, drugged. He wakes up in a safe room in the US Embassy, where their conversations are secure, and meets Agent Novak, who leads the operation. We learn that Mansky is a genius who defeated Konigsberg twenty years before but has an unpredictable temperament. He has some part to play in the winning of the Cold War. 

He is told he will have to compete in a chess tournament against Alexander Gavrylov in the Polish capital, Warsaw as Konigsberg, the earstwhile American contender, has died. Per tournament rules, Mansky is the only eligible substitute for Konigsberg, as Mansky was the last person to beat him; Konigsberg was found dead by Soviet poisoning.

Mansky agrees to play. However, his drinking problem becomes apparent when he is found unconscious in his hotel room. Amphetamine drugs help him to regain consciousness before he has to go on to the chess match stage to make his first official appearance as the replacement American player. He is unable to make the first ceremonial move on the chess board after his opponent as he sees 8900 moves at one time.
Mansky is housed in the hotel venue of the chess match Palace of Culture and Science in Warsaw and meets the hotel director (Alfred Slega) who also seems to like alcohol. The hotel director is told by a Soviet general major (General Krutov, Russian counter-intelligence) to 'look after' Mansky, implying he will keep the American chess player drunk.

The film cuts to 4 days before the opening scene. Mansky recalls he got drunk with the hotel director in the morning and does not recall the day at all including the first chess game. Agent Stone reveals that he won the game in 32 moves only. Mansky's eccentric behaviour and alcoholism is revealed to be partly due to his sheer brilliance, with alcohol slowing his brain function enough to operate more normally.

The Russian general major meets Gavrylov, and encourages him to keep playing on despite losing the first match.  He tells Alfred to deny the American delegation alcohol. However, Mansky continues to access alcohol, smuggling it from functions he attends as part of the Chess social evenings.
 
In the second game, a hypnotist in the audience blocks Mansky's thoughts and he concedes the game. Agent White pursues the hypnotist out of the chess game theatre, but is stopped by members of the Soviet group, who threaten his family who they know a lot about, including his wife being pregnant. Among the tournament attendees is a Soviet officer who is working with the Americans, Agent White tells Agent Stone they call him Gift. He is not sure how to identify him.

Alfred Slega befriends Mansky, and comes to him via a secret back door into his room wardrobe that allows passage into the toilets in the lobby, where he hides some alcohol for Mansky to secretly use as needed. He shares his personal experience of Soviet influence over communist Poland with Mansky, and views the Warsaw Pact as merely a continuation of the German Nazi occupation. Together, they sneak in and out of the hotel through the Warsaw sewers, and Mansky learns the topography of the city through the Hotel Director as if it were a chess board. Alfred possesses a red book that allows immunity from questioning from Soviet troops. They go to a bar where they meet many of the Director’s friends, who support Mansky in the chess more than Gavrylov, and who are sympathetic to American values.
 
The next day Agent White visits Mansky’s room, which is now shown to be bugged by the Soviets. He tells Mansky that someone may approach him in Soviet uniform that he can trust, who has a scar at the back of his right hand. Before Agent White can say anymore, he dies in Mansky’s arms, poisoned. Mansky calls Agent Stone, who asks Mansky why Agent White came into his room. Mansky says the room is bugged, but Agent Stone tells him the room is clean. Mansky becomes distraught, so Stone takes him to the US embassy on medical grounds, where they try to brief him on the latest in Cuba. The third game is considered a draw due to his feigned illness.

The agents tell Mansky about John Gift, a code name for a high ranking Soviet officer who is a spy, who only Agent White was working with. He was going to deliver the blueprints for the warheads in Cuba, but the Soviets stung the Americans in Moscow with the assistance of a spy within the Americans; given Gift was coming to Warsaw for the tournament, the chess game is in fact a game within a game, Gift searching for an opportunity to provide critical information to the Americans regarding Soviet capabilities and intentions in Cuba. Gift knows he can trust Mansky, as clearly he cannot be a spy. Agent Stone tells Mansky he needs to get the microfilm of the blueprints from Gift, hidden within a champagne cork. To do this, Mansky has to make the next game a draw, so the Soviet delegation comes to the after-match social event.

General Krutov explains to one of his staff that Americans call a democracy one in which they discriminate against women and Black peoples, and perpetuate social inequality between the rich and the worker, and force poorer nations to give away their riches to the USA, waging war against those who do not follow the American model by nationalising their industries. Mansky's relates to Agent Stone on their return to the hotel his prior assistance to Robert Oppenheimer and the Manhattan Project, which birthed the profoundly destructive power of nuclear weapons into human hands, for which he remains regretful.
 
During the fourth game, Mansky looks to the audience often during the game, his thinking obviously not on the game, speculating who might be John Gift. In a break period, he goes to the lobby toilets to drink some of the hidden alcohol whereupon General Krutov’s staff member enters his cubicle and hands him a cork. Agent Stone then enters the cubicle, and tells Mansky to keep the cork despite Mansky offering it to her. Then both she and the other Soviet are attacked and killed in the toilet by a man in Soviet uniform.

Mansky returns to the game, which is back to the opening scene of the film. His brain, suddenly transformed by the alcohol, switches on and he proposes a draw to the judges. His opponent turns this down disdainfully, as Mansky is clearly in a bad position from the earlier passage of play. Mansky then makes a number of quick moves in the game interspersed by countermoves by an increasingly frustrated Gavrylov and when he proposes a draw again to the judges, Gavrylov agrees and he applauds Mansky, squaring the series 2-2. 

When Mansky asks to go back to the US embassy he is told the American delegation have to stay in the hotel quarantined, Mansky goes back to his room, and the usual social event after the match carries on without him, the rest of the Soviet delegation being present along with Gavrylov. 

Alfred smuggles some alcohol out of the event and brings it to Mansky’s room via the secret entrance in his wardrobe. Mansky asks him for help; Alfred switches on the radio loud, clearly knowing the room is bugged. Alfred says he cannot help Mansky leave the hotel, but gives him the red book, and says to not allow the Soviets to trace it back to him in case Mansky gets caught. Mansky goes into the lobby toilets by the secret passageways, and escapes into the city to head to the US embassy.
 
The world is now 24 hours from a confrontation between the USA and the USSR. At the US embassy, in the safe room, he recounts the events to Agent Novak – and says that Gift killed Stone, who was going to kill Mansky. Gift gave him another cork, and soaked the one Mansky had gotten earlier in Stone’s blood, to help him identify the bad one. He then told Mansky to remember the word Rakirovka. It still is not clear to Novak whether Stone is the spy or not, and he has four hours to give President Kennedy a decision on whether to place a blockade around Cuba or not. Mansky is not sure who to trust, as Agent White did not tell Novak about the scar on Gift’s hand either. 

Novak tells Mansky that the cork soaked in Stone’s blood says the nuclear weapons are ready; the one given by Gift suggests the Soviets are bluffing. President Kennedy wants to communicate with Mansky by secure telegram, who wonders whether Gift is not on the American’s side at all. Using a riddle, Mansky passes a message to the President, and Kennedy announces a blockade of ships to Cuba containing offensive material. Mansky tells Novak to thank Gift. 

General Krutov and the Soviets find the dead bodies in the lobby toilet, and he discovers Mansky’s secret is alcohol, realising that the Hotel Director Alfred must have befriended Mansky. Novak tells Mansky that Rakirovka means castling, meaning imminent danger. Krutov realises with Kennedy’s announcement that the Soviets have lost this battle, and orders a search for the spy in their midst, and for the Hotel Director to be summoned to him, who he tortures, as he knows Alfred put Mansky in the room with the secret passage, and is sympathetic to America.
 
At the fifth and deciding game, Mansky sees Gift outside in the lobby. A man in Soviet uniform is then seen to exit the hotel via the secret passages Mansky has been using all this time, whilst Gavrylov awaits for Mansky to appear at the chess table. At the exit of the secret passages into the alley leading into the streets of Warsaw, Krutov and his team are waiting. The man in the Soviet uniform they apprehend coming out of the secret passage is actually Mansky, whilst Gift uses the red book which Alfred gave to Mansky to leave the hotel which is under quarantine by Krutov to try to find the spy. Gift is wearing Mansky’s clothes. Novak rushes into the alley and stops Krutov from killing Mansky as he is protected by diplomatic immunity. Mansky cannot appear in the final game, which is forfeit, and Gavrylov wins the tournament.
 
Novak flies Mansky back to the USA. The press at the airport accuse Mansky of having humiliated the USA despite him having avoided nuclear war without their knowing. Novak says to Mansky that he is a citizen hero and will be looked after, and hands him a hip flask. Novak exits the car and Gift enters the car to join Mansky, who gives Alfred’s red book to him, saying he was killed. Gift says he saw the Soviet order of attack. Mansky tells Gift that Novak wants to take care of them, but gives Gift the hip flask, and leaves the car, not wanting Novak’s protection.

Talks commence between the United States and the Soviet Union, which ultimately result in mutual deescalation steps such as the withdrawal of nuclear-tipped missiles from some territories. The final montage goes on to mention later nuclear arms control agreements such as the INF Treaty of 1987, and later USA assistance with nuclear disarmament in former communist countries in the Eastern Bloc after the Revolutions of 1989.

However, the epilogue notes: "In February 2019, the United States of America suspended compliance with the INF Treaty. The same day, Vladimir Putin announced that Russia also suspended the INF treaty and will develop new intermediate-range ballistic missiles."

"Our moral imperative is to work with all powers for that day when the children of the world will grow up without the fear of nuclear war." - Ronald Reagan

Cast

 Bill Pullman as Joshua Mansky, an alcoholic, professional chess player who is kidnapped to play a chess game and save the world from nuclear war. 
 Lotte Verbeek as Agent Stone, an American agent who helps kidnap Mansky. 
 James Bloor as Agent White, another American agent who helps kidnap Mansky.
 Robert Więckiewicz as Alfred, director of the Palace of Culture and Science and former WWII Polish Resistance hero, who befriends Mansky.
 Aleksey Serebryakov as General Krutov
 Corey Johnson as Donald Novak, another American agent.
 Nicholas Farrell as Griswald Moran
 Evgeniy Sidikhin as Alexander Gavrylov Mansky's Russian opponent in the chess game.

Production
Filming took place from February to April 2018 in Warsaw. William Hurt, originally cast as Joshua Mansky, suffered an accident while returning from the film set to his apartment, just a few days into shooting, and was replaced by Bill Pullman.

The Coldest Game was the last film produced by Piotr Woźniak-Starak, who died shortly before the premiere. His death was ruled an accident. The cause of death was head trauma caused by a "sharp-edged tool", and it was claimed that the movie producer fell off his boat into a lake and had his head crushed by the propeller of his own boat. His cell phone remained on the boat. A 27-year-old woman who was also on the boat survived, and the movie producer's bodyguard reportedly attempted a suicide soon after.

Release
The film premiered on September 18, 2019 at the 44th Gdynia Polish Film Festival to positive critics' reviews and was released in Polish theaters on November 8, 2019.

The international release was planned for early 2020.

It was released globally via streaming on February 8, 2020 through Netflix.

Critical response 

Writing for the Chicago Reader, Jamie Ludwig said: "You'd expect a film that involves espionage and a high-stakes chess tournament during the height of the Cold War to leave you on the edge of your seat. But then there's The Coldest Game. Bill Pullman (who stepped into the lead role after the original actor William Hurt was injured just before production began) gives a fantastic performance as Professor Joshua Mansky... kidnapped by government agents and brought to Warsaw to compete against the Russians at chess after their first pick was murdered. However, Pullman alone can't make up for a premise that never completely gels, immemorable characters (Robert Więckiewicz as the Palace of Culture and Science director is a welcome exception), and loads of cliches. A few moments of dark humor beg to transform the film into a Vonnegut-type satire - it might have been better served had it been steered in that direction."

In a 2 stars out of 4 review, Roger Moore from Movie Nation wrote: "I'm a sucker for a good Cold War thriller. A middling one? Yeah, I'll sit through one of those, too. The Coldest Game falls in the latter category... The whole affair - again, fictional - is a jumble of U-2 flights and intrigues, "quiet" rooms (bugs are everywhere) and booze. Pullman keeps up with it all, but he lost me here and there. But the Mid-Century Soviet fashion, furniture and design is properly gloomy... The performances are solid even when the story is at its most convoluted. And there are third act twists that atone for some of what's lacking in the first two."

Demetrios Matheou from the Screen Daily wrote: "This Cold War thriller [...] features a fruity premise and respectable talent on either side of the camera [...] And yet the end result of what is a clearly enthusiastic enterprise is remarkably average." He noted that the potential of a movie combining "spy intrigue, the historical crisis and the renowned temperament of the chess elite", obviously evoking the Fischer-Spassky match, was wasted. He had some praise for Pullman and Więckiewicz's performances and found the scenes depicting the pair's drunk escapade "effective", but also stated the chess matches were "a botched business, presented with no logic or tension". "A clunky script and endemic hyperactivity in all departments results in the kind of film that is more guilty pleasure than edge-of-seat thriller".

John Serba, writing for the Decider, gave the movie a negative review, centering his critism on Pullman's character, which he considered cartoonish and hammy. "A couple of the twists [...] are pretty good. The movie is reasonably strong down the stretch as it meets but doesn't surpass expectations of its genre. It's slickly produced in the sense that it has the clean, digital look of a production with a low budget that's trying to look expensive. It's fine. But the movie hinges on Pullman", whose "characterization of a hopeless boozer is so far over the top, it makes Charles Bukowski look like Ned Flanders. His character as written is thin-shaved lunch meat, and he just stacks up the ham."

Common Sense Media, which rates movies based on their family-friendliness, gave the movie 1 out of 5 stars because of high amounts of violence (4/5), language (4/5) and drinking, drugs and smoking (5/5).

Relationship to real events

Cuban Missile Crisis

An important question in the movie is whether the Soviets already have nuclear warheads in Cuba, or are yet to ship them to Cuba. As told by Soviet general Gribkov in 1992 (and repeated in the 2003 book Wilson's Ghost by McNamara & Blight), Soviet forces in Cuba at that point did have nuclear warheads there: 162 of them, including at least 90 tactical nuclear warheads; these warheads were just 90 miles from US shores. Furthermore, on October 26, 1962, the warheads were moved from their storage sites to positions closer to their delivery vehicles (missiles), to be launched in case of American invasion. According to McNamara, the Americans did not believe Soviet warheads were already in Cuba; if both Gribkov and McNamara are telling the truth, then the Americans decided on the course of action while not knowing how real the threat was.

The last vodka

The method of killing shown in the movie, dubbed "the last vodka" in the movie - injecting alcohol directly into the victim's bloodstream to fake accidental death from overdrinking - has long been alleged to be used by former communist secret service operatives in Poland to eliminate opponents and witnesses (or to perform example killings to scare others into silence). These allegations came mainly from anti-communists, including members of the opposition from the times when Poland was a one-party authoritarian communist state. A notable example is Sylwester Zych, a priest whom the Milicja Obywatelska blamed for the death of one of their own. In 1989, S.Zych died, officially from alcohol poisoning, but surprisingly the concentration of alcohol in one of his arms was much higher than elsewhere in his body, suggesting the alcohol was injected in the arm, not taken orally.

See also 
A Beautiful Mind
Polish People's Republic
Cold War

References

External links
 
 The Coldest Game on ChessBase.com

Cold War films
Films about chess
Films about the Cuban Missile Crisis
Polish-language films
English-language Polish films
Films set in 1962
Films set in Warsaw
Films shot in Poland
Films produced by Robert Kijak
Films produced by Anna Wasniewska-Gill
2010s English-language films